Bonzie Alexander Colson II (born January 12, 1996) is an American professional basketball player for Maccabi Tel Aviv of the Israeli Basketball Premier League and the EuroLeague. He played college basketball for the University of Notre Dame.

Early development
Colson, the son of a former Rhode Island player who went into college coaching, played high school basketball in that state at St. Andrew's School in Barrington, as well as AAU basketball with Boston Area Basketball Club. He developed as a pure post player, but was abnormally short for the position—during a basketball camp in summer 2013, he measured at 6' 4.5" (1.93 m) in shoes. Despite his physical stature, advanced statistics showed him to be unusually effective in the frontcourt; in July 2013, Colson had the top player efficiency rating (PER) among frontcourt players in Nike's Elite Youth Basketball League.

While Colson was largely ignored by major programs as a frontcourt prospect, Notre Dame assistant Martin Ingelsby, who went on to become head coach at Delaware, had a very different view, based on Colson's production in both high school and AAU play, as well as a disproportionate wingspan of 6' 11.5" (2.12 m). When Colson visited Notre Dame in September 2013, the coaching staff made Nike's PER study a major part of its pitch, convincing him that the Fighting Irish program, devoted to offensive efficiency, would be the best fit for a player of his type. He would commit to Notre Dame that October.

College career
In Colson's freshman season at Notre Dame, he came off the bench for 31 of his 32 appearances. He recorded a 17-point performance in a win over Duke in the semi-final game of the ACC Tournament. At the end of the season, he was named Notre Dame Newcomer of the Year. Colson appeared in 36 games in his sophomore season, starting in 24. He recorded the first 30-point game of his career on January 16, 2016, leading Notre Dame to its first victory over Duke at Cameron Indoor Stadium. 

In his junior season, Colson became Notre Dame's leading scorer (17.8 points per game; 9th in the ACC), led the ACC in rebounding (10.1 per game) and was eighth in blocks per game (1.4), and was named to the All-ACC first team. He was also the first player shorter than 6' 7" to lead the ACC in rebounding since 1958.

Prior to the 2017–18 season, Colson was named the preseason ACC Player of the Year and a first-team preseason All-American by the Associated Press. After missing 15 games during the regular season with a broken foot, Colson broke his left foot again in Notre Dame's NIT tournament game against Penn State. In 2017-18, he averaged 19.7 points per game (3rd in the ACC), 10.1 rebounds (3rd), 1.7 steals (6th), and 2.2 blocks (5th).

Professional career

Canton Charge (2018–2019)
On September 18, 2018, Colson signed with the Cleveland Cavaliers. On October 13, he was waived by the Cavaliers, but was added to the roster of the Cavs’ NBA G League affiliate, the Canton Charge. In his first G League game, a 101–89 loss to the Wisconsin Herd, Colson led the team with 23 points and 15 rebounds, shooting 10-of-18 from the floor. For the G League team, in 23 games he averaged 15.5 points, 7.8 rebounds, and 1.5 blocks per game.

Milwaukee Bucks (2019)
On January 15, 2019, Colson was signed to a two-way contract by the Milwaukee Bucks. Under the terms of the deal, he split time with the Bucks’ G League affiliate, the Wisconsin Herd. For the G League team, in 23 games he averaged 14.3 points, 6.0 rebounds, and 0.8 blocks per game. Colson made his NBA debut on February 25, 2019, against the Chicago Bulls, playing three minutes in the Bucks 117–106 win.

On March 31, Colson started his first NBA game against the Atlanta Hawks and in that game, he managed to score 15 points and grabbed 16 rebounds in 41 minutes of playing time.

On July 21, 2019, Colson was waived by the Bucks.

Darüşşafaka (2019–2020)
On July 30, 2019, Colson signed with Darüşşafaka. Colson and the team mutually parted ways on April 24, 2020. Colson averaged 12.2 points and 5.1 rebounds per game in the Turkish League and 10.8 points and 5.0 rebounds in EuroCup play.

SIG Strasbourg (2020–2021)
On August 31, 2020, Colson signed with SIG Strasbourg. He was named player of the week on October 14, after posting 24 points, nine rebounds and two assists in a win against Orléans Loiret Basket. In 49 games he averaged 18.1 points, 5.3 rebounds, and 0.6 blocks per game. In games in the Jeep Elite he was 2nd in the league with 18.4 points per game.

Pınar Karşıyaka (2021–2022)
On July 10, 2021, Colson signed with Pınar Karşıyaka of the Turkish Super League In 42 games he averaged 15.9 points, 7.2 rebounds, and 0.8 blocks per game. In games in the Turkish Super League he was 7th in the league with 16.9 points per game, 7th with 7.0 rebounds per game, 7th with 1.6 steals per game, and 9th with 0.8 blocks per game.

Maccabi Tel Aviv (2022–present)
On June 22, 2022, he signed with Maccabi Tel Aviv of the Israeli Basketball Premier League.

Playing style
In a 2016 story, Sports Illustrated writer Luke Winn called Colson "one of college basketball’s greatest anomalies." While Colson was not much larger than in high school—by then, he claimed to be 6'5" (1.96 m) tall with a 7' (2.13 m) wingspan—Notre Dame was frequently playing him as a center alongside four guards, three of them taller than Colson. As early as his high school and AAU days, according to Winn, "he knew how to work angles to get off all kinds of funky shots" and "played with a chip on his shoulder due to being ignored by many big-time schools". In his final two seasons at Notre Dame, Colson began to include three-pointers in his skill set, enabling him to also play as a stretch four in some Notre Dame lineups. He began this process in summer 2016, when he spent five days in California with NBA player Jared Dudley, whom Colson had known as a young boy while his father was coaching Dudley at Boston College.

Career statistics

Regular season 

|-
| style="text-align:left;"| 
| style="text-align:left;"| Milwaukee
| 8 || 2 || 12.3 || .333 || .238 || .889 || 3.8 || .4 || .6 || .1 || 4.9
|- class="sortbottom"
| style="text-align:center;" colspan="2"| Career
| 8 || 2 || 12.3 || .333 || .238 || .889 || 3.8 || .4 || .6 || .1 || 4.9

References

External links
 
 Notre Dame Fighting Irish bio
 TBLStat.net Profile

1996 births
Living people
21st-century African-American sportspeople
African-American basketball players
All-American college men's basketball players
American expatriate basketball people in Turkey
American men's basketball players
Basketball players from Massachusetts
Basketball players from Washington, D.C.
Canton Charge players
Darüşşafaka Basketbol players
Karşıyaka basketball players
Maccabi Tel Aviv B.C. players
Milwaukee Bucks players
Notre Dame Fighting Irish men's basketball players
Power forwards (basketball)
Small forwards
Sportspeople from New Bedford, Massachusetts
Undrafted National Basketball Association players
Wisconsin Herd players